Defence Housing Australia (DHA) is an Australian government business enterprise established by the Defence Housing Australia Act 1987. DHA supplies housing and related services to Australian Defence Force members and their families in line with Defence operational requirements. To meet these requirements, DHA is active in Australian residential housing markets, acquiring and developing land, and constructing and purchasing houses.

Each year, DHA sells a portion of its portfolio through a property investment and leaseback program. Revenue generated from this activity is DHA's primary source of capital. It funds DHA's operations and enables the continual provision of housing to Defence members and their families.

Services for Defence members and families 
 Assistance in finding housing
 Management and maintenance of housing
 Administration of the allowance for Defence members occupying rental accommodation
 Construction and acquisition of properties to meet Defence housing demands
 Redevelopment of properties to meet Defence standards.

Services for investors and property owners 
 Sale and leaseback of properties through the property investment program
 Secure, long-term leasing arrangements for property owners
 Property maintenance and tenancy management.

Residential development 
DHA is also a residential developer with projects across Australia.

Governance 
DHA was established as a statutory authority in 1988 and in 1992 became a government business enterprise. This means DHA is a commercially funded organisation that undertakes business activities on behalf of the Government.

Possible privatisation
In February 2014, the National Commission of Audit recommended in its Phase One Report that the Commonwealth sell its interest in Defence Housing Australia.

References

Commonwealth Government-owned companies of Australia
Housing in Australia
Australian Defence Force
1987 establishments in Australia